Douglas Besterman (born February 3, 1965) is an American orchestrator, musical arranger and music producer. He is the recipient of three Tony Awards out of six total nominations and two Drama Desk Awards out of six total nominations, and was a 2009 Grammy Award nominee.

Personal life 
Besterman currently resides in New York.  Doug grew up in the New York suburb of Monsey.  He attended Ramapo High School and the University of Rochester/Eastman School of Music.  His father (Kenny Besterman) was a child performer on The Horn and Hardart Children's Hour.
Doug Besterman married Alida Michal in 2021. He has three children from previous marriages.

Career 
Besterman found work in New York City in 1986 as a rehearsal pianist. In 1990, he met Danny Troob, who recommended Besterman to work on an Off-Broadway musical with Alan Menken. Besterman then began an extensive career in film with Lincoln (1992), subsequently orchestrating Disney's Pocahontas in 1995.

He made his Broadway debut with Damn Yankees (1994), for which he was nominated for a Drama Desk Award for Outstanding Orchestrations. Besterman was also nominated for the latter in 1997, with Big: the Musical. He won his first Tony Award for Best Orchestrations in 1999, for orchestrating Fosse with Ralph Burns.

Besterman was nominated for the Tony Award for The Music Man in 2000, for which he also received his third Drama Desk Award nomination.

Besterman won his second Tony Award and his first Drama Desk Award for the Broadway and West End productions of The Producers (2001). In 2002, he shared these awards with Ralph Burns for the original Broadway production of Thoroughly Modern Millie, starring Sutton Foster. Burns had died in November 2001 and Besterman accepted the awards. In his acceptance speech at the 2002 Tony Awards, Besterman was quoted as saying, "I'm sad to be here without him."

In 2001, Besterman orchestrated Rodgers and Hammerstein's score in the TV movie South Pacific. In 2002 he served as orchestrator for the Academy Award-winning film adaptation of Chicago. Besterman also arranged music for the 2003 film Piglet's Big Movie.

In 2004, Besterman orchestrated music for the original productions of Dracula, the Musical at the La Jolla Playhouse and Broadway's Belasco Theatre.

Besterman provided orchestrations and arrangements for the 2005 West End production of Guys and Dolls.

Also in 2005, Besterman reunited with The Producers composer Mel Brooks for the film version of the same name. He again worked with Brooks on his 2007 musical adaptation of Young Frankenstein, for which he was nominated for his sixth Drama Desk Award and first Grammy Award.

Besterman worked with writer Debra Fordham and composers Jeff Marx and Robert Lopez for a musical episode of Scrubs, titled "My Musical", which aired in 2007. Many  described initial misgivings that the musical concept would make the episode seem gimmicky, but these fears were, for the most part, put to rest by the fact that the episode was "logically insane."

In 2008, Besterman orchestrated songs for the Houston, Texas, premiere of The Gershwins' An American In Paris, a musical adaptation of the 1951 film of the same name. It played from April 29, 2008, to June 22, 2008.

In concerts, Besterman has orchestrated performances for Mel Brooks and Chita Rivera at the Kennedy Center Honors, Beyoncé Knowles' 2002 benefit concert, and the "Stephen Sondheim 75th Birthday Celebration" with the Los Angeles Philharmonic. In addition, he has worked with the Boston Pops Orchestra and the Hollywood Bowl Orchestra.

Orchestrations for ballets include Take Five (More Or Less) (Pacific Northwest Ballet), Double Feature (New York City Ballet), and But Not For Me (Martha Graham Dance Company); all of these were choreographed by Susan Stroman.

He wrote orchestrations to the La Jolla Playhouse's 2010 production of Limelight: The Story of Charlie Chaplin. He orchestrated songs for a musical adaptation, titled Elf the Musical, of the 2003 film Elf, which played at the Al Hirschfeld Theatre on Broadway in winter 2010.

Besterman was the orchestrator for Rob Ashford's 2011 Broadway revival of Frank Loesser's How to Succeed in Business Without Really Trying, starring Daniel Radcliffe, for which he has been nominated for his fifth Tony Award for Best Orchestrations. For this production, Besterman scaled down the orchestra: "Music director David Chase and orchestrator Doug Besterman explored ways to honor the contributions of the original music team (music director Elliot Lawrence and orchestrator Robert Ginzler) while capitalizing on the assets of a streamlined 14-member orchestra." When describing Besterman's approach for these new orchestrations, producers Craig Zadan and Neil Meron wrote:

He also provided orchestrations for the London, Broadway, and Hamburg productions of the musical Sister Act. These productions opened on June 2, 2009 (London), December 2, 2010 (Hamburg), and April 20, 2011 (Broadway).

Besterman provided orchestrations for the 2011 film remake of Winnie the Pooh, with music and lyrics by Robert Lopez and Kristen Anderson-Lopez, with contributions by The Sherman Brothers.

Besterman orchestrated, with Michael Starobin, the Roundabout Theatre Company's musical The People in the Picture (2011), concerning a grandmother recalling her life in the Yiddish theater and the Holocaust. Besterman will also provide orchestrations for the upcoming MCC Theater revival of the 1988 musical Carrie.

Discography 
 All credits as music producer.

Awards and nominations 
Wins
1999 Tony Award, Best Orchestrations, Fosse
2001 Tony Award, Best Orchestrations, The Producers
2001 Drama Desk Award, Outstanding Orchestrations, The Producers
2002 Tony Award, Best Orchestrations, Thoroughly Modern Millie
2002 Drama Desk Award, Outstanding Orchestrations, Thoroughly Modern Millie

Nominations
1994 Drama Desk Award, Outstanding Orchestrations, Damn Yankees
1997 Drama Desk Award, Outstanding Orchestrations, Big
2000 Tony Award, Best Orchestrations, The Music Man
2000 Drama Desk Award, Outstanding Orchestrations, The Music Man
2008 Drama Desk Award, Outstanding Orchestrations, Young Frankenstein
2009 Grammy Award, Best Musical Show Album, Young Frankenstein
2011 Tony Award, Best Orchestrations, How to Succeed in Business Without Really Trying
2014 Tony Award, Best Orchestrations, Bullets Over Broadway
2017 Drama Desk Award, Best Orchestrations, "Anastasia "

References

External links 
Official website, dougbesterman.com

Doug Besterman at the Lortel Archives/Internet Off-Broadway Database

American male composers
21st-century American composers
Living people
Tony Award winners
Drama Desk Award winners
Record producers from New York (state)
American music arrangers
1965 births
21st-century American male musicians